The year 1916 in archaeology involved some significant events.

Explorations

Excavations
 Start of first excavations at Adelsö.
 In Ireland, the burial mound at Grannagh, near Ardrahan in County Galway, is first excavated by R. A. Stewart Macalister (re-excavated in 1969 by Etienne Rynne).

Publications
 Grafton Elliot Smith - On the Significance of the Geographical Distribution of Mummification: a study of the migrations of peoples and the spread of certain customs and beliefs.

Finds
 Uaxactun and the first known Maya inscription from the 8th Baktun of the Maya calendar are found by Sylvanus G. Morley.

Births
 January 1 - Paul Faure, French Mediterranean archaeologist (d. 2007)
 June 14 - Joe Caldwell, American archaeologist (d. 1973)
 August 23 - Sheppard Frere, British archaeologist of the Roman Empire (d. 2015)
 August 27 - Halet Çambel, Turkish archaeologist (d. 2014)
 September 15 - Vronwy Hankey, British Near Eastern archaeologist (d. 1998)
 November 3 - Rúaidhrí de Valera, Irish archaeologist (d. 1978)
 Matteo Sansone, Italian archaeologist (d. 1992)
 Probable date - Tahsin Özgüç, Turkish archaeologist (d. 2005)

Deaths
 May 25 - Jane Dieulafoy, French archaeologist, explorer, novelist and journalist (b. 1851)
 October 3 - James Burgess, Scottish archaeologist active in India (b. 1832)

References

Archaeology
Archaeology
Archaeology by year